Thomas Koerfer (born 23 March 1944) is a Swiss film director, screenwriter and producer.

Life and career 
Born  in Bern, Koerfer studied  economics and sociology in Berlin, Munich and St. Gallen. He started his career as assistant director of Alexander Kluge and Brunello Rondi. His film debut  was screened at the International Critics' Week of the 1974 Cannes Film Festival, while his 1983 film Embers entered the main competition at the 40th Venice International Film Festival.

Filmography 
 The Death of the Flea Circus Director (Der Tod des Flohzirkusdirektors oder Ottocaro Weiss reformiert seine Firma, 1973)
 Der Gehülfe (1975)
 Alzire oder der neue Kontinent  (1977)
 Die Leidenschaftlichen (1981)
 Embers (1983)
 Konzert für Alice (1985)
 Noch ein Wunsch (TV-movie, 1989)
 Exit Genua (1990)
 Gesichter der Schweiz (1991)

References

External links
 

1944 births
Living people
People from Bern
Swiss screenwriters
Male screenwriters
Swiss film directors
Swiss film producers